Bei Zeng is a Chinese quantum information theorist at the Hong Kong University of Science and Technology, where she is a professor of physics, and director of the IAS Center for Quantum Technologies. As well as quantum information, her research interests include quantum computing and quantum error correction.

Education and career
Zeng is a 2002 graduate of Tsinghua University, where she studied physics and mathematics. After earning a master's degree at Tsinghua University in 2004, she completed a Ph.D. in physics in 2009 at the Massachusetts Institute of Technology. Her dissertation, Quantum operations and codes beyond the Stabilizer-Clifford framework, was supervised by Isaac Chuang.

She became a postdoctoral researcher at the University of Waterloo, affiliated both with the Institute for Quantum Computing and the Department of Combinatorics & Optimization, before becoming an assistant professor at the University of Guelph in 2010, rising through the academic ranks there to become full professor in 2018. She moved to her present position at the Hong Kong University of Science and Technology in 2019. She continues to maintain an adjunct faculty affiliation with the University of Waterloo Department of Physics and Astronomy.

Book
Zeng is a coauthor of the book Quantum Information Meets Quantum Matter: From Quantum Entanglement to Topological Phases of Many-Body Systems (with Xie Chen, Duan-Lu Zhou, and Xiao-Gang Wen, Springer, 2019).

Recognition
In 2021, Zeng was named a Fellow of the American Physical Society (APS), after a nomination from the APS Division of Quantum Information, "for pioneering work and contributions in quantum information science (QIS), including error correction and fault-tolerance, many-body entanglement, quantum tomography, quantum marginals, and QIS applications in quantum matter, and for her long-term contribution to QIS services and education".

References

External links

Year of birth missing (living people)
Living people
Chinese physicists
Chinese women physicists
Quantum information scientists
Tsinghua University alumni
Massachusetts Institute of Technology alumni
Academic staff of the University of Guelph
Academic staff of the Hong Kong University of Science and Technology
Fellows of the American Physical Society